Odostomella bicincta is a species of sea snail, a marine gastropod mollusk in the family Pyramidellidae, the pyrams and their allies.

Distribution
This species occurs in the following locations:
 Canary Islands
 Cape Verde
 Mediterranean Sea

References

External links
 To CLEMAM
 To Encyclopedia of Life

Pyramidellidae
Gastropods described in 1868
Molluscs of Macaronesia
Molluscs of the Mediterranean Sea
Molluscs of the Canary Islands
Gastropods of Cape Verde